The Democratic Socialist Party was a political party in Morocco.

History and profile
The party was founded in 1996 as a split from the Organisation de l'Action Démocratique Populaire  over the constitutional referendum held in September 1996.

In the parliamentary election held on 27 September 2002, the party won 6 out of 325 seats. In the next parliamentary election, held on 7 September 2007, the party did not win any seats, as it merged with the USFP in 2005.

References

1996 establishments in Morocco
Defunct political parties in Morocco
Defunct socialist parties
Democratic socialist parties in Africa
Political parties established in 1996
Socialist parties in Morocco